Blendon can refer to:
 Blendon, London
 Blendon Township, Michigan
 Blendon Township, Franklin County, Ohio